Vadlur or vadloor is a village in Bejjanki mandal, Siddipet district, Telangana, India.

It is located at Latitude: 11.55 / Longitude: 79.55

 

Present Vadlur or Vadloor Sarpanch is NALUVALA SWAMY

References

Villages in Siddipet district